Thysanophrys armata is a species of marine ray-finned fish belonging to the family Platycephalidae, the flatheads. It is a little known species which is found in the Indo-Pacific where it has been recorded from the Philippines and Sri Lanka.

References

Platycephalidae
Taxa named by Henry Weed Fowler
Fish described in 1938